KZEW (101.7 FM, "The Zoo") is a radio station broadcasting an adult contemporary music format. Licensed to Wheatland, Wyoming, United States, the station is currently owned by Smith Broadcasting, Incorporated, and features programming from NBC News Radio and Dial Global.

History
The station went on the air as KYCN-FM on November 15, 1984.  On September 4, 1998, the station changed its call sign to the current KZEW. Prior to 1998, the KZEW call sign was used by what was then an album-oriented rock station in Dallas, Texas which from 1973 to 1989 invented the phrase "The Zoo" September 19, 1973, and has since changed to KBFB.

References

External links

ZEW
Mainstream adult contemporary radio stations in the United States